The RG-33 is a mine-resistant light armored vehicle initially designed by BAE Systems Land Systems South Africa (formerly Land Systems OMC), a South African subsidiary of BAE Systems. BAE Systems in the US extensively modified it with additional protection, new powertrain, and suspension systems. It was built in a number of locations including York, Pennsylvania. It was one of several vehicles being fielded by the US Armed Forces in Iraq under the MRAP program.

Overview
It is based on the RG-31, which itself is based on the Mamba APC, although it is roughly twice the weight of a RG-31. There are two variants, the standard RG-33 has four wheels and weighs 22 tons while the extended RG-33L variant has six wheels, can carry twice as many people in the back, and weighs 26 to 37 tons depending on the version.

It was selected to be the sole producer of the US Army's $2.88 billion Medium Mine Protected Vehicle program. The initial contract is worth $20 million. BAE representative Doug Coffey says that live-fire testing at Aberdeen, Maryland, proved the RG-33 to be the overall most survivable MRAP vehicle.

The RG33 is manufactured in several configurations including the category I 4×4, category II 6×6, the heavy armored ground ambulance (HAGA) and the special operations command (SOCOM) vehicle.

Design
It features a monocoque armored v-hull, for maximized interior space, seats and footrests suspended from the ceiling, run-flat tires, and an optional armored glass turret (Gunner Protection Kit or GPK), for maximized visibility and protection. The monocoque hull does not extend under the engine like some other armored vehicles. The engine compartment is a separate monocoque structure that bolts to rest of the hull.  The vehicle is notable for its extensive use of TRAPP armored glass in the crew compartment. Like the Buffalo, it can be equipped with a robotic arm.

The U.S. has fielded 259 RG-33 4x4 variants in a Special Operations Command (SOCOM) configuration as shown above with remote weapon stations, two extra seats, and a rear door assist. The U.S. has also fielded 16 RG-33L 6x6 variants in a Heavy Armored Ground Ambulance (HAGA) configuration.

The Pentagon has future plans to add the Crows II remote weapon station, Boomerang anti-sniper system, and the Frag Kit 6 anti-EFP armor.

Production history
On 26 January 2007, four (2 of each variant) RG-33s were delivered to the United States Marine Corps for testing.
On 14 February, an order for 15 MRAP Cat 1 RG-33s and 75 MRAP Cat 2 RG-33Ls was placed under an Indefinite Delivery, Indefinite Quantity contract.
On 28 June, BAE received a $235.8M order for 16 RG-33 Cat 1 patrol vehicles, 239 RG-33L Cat 2 vehicles, 170 RG-33 Cat 1 variants for the United States Special Operations Command, out of their total allotment of 333 vehicles, and 16 RG-33L Cat 2 Ambulance variants, which are the first vehicles in the competition specifically listed for the ambulance role. The vehicle can be mission configured for a number of roles including Infantry Carrier, Ambulance, Command and Control, Convoy Escort and Explosive Ordnance Disposal. On 18/Oct, an additional order for 600 MRAPS was received, involving 399 RGL-33L Cat 2, 112 RGL-33L Cat 2 Ambulance variants and 89 RG-33 SOCOM for 322 Million dollars. On Dec/18/07 a further order for 600 RG-33L Cat 2 was awarded to BAE Systems, for 645 Million dollars. To date, this gives a total of 1,735 RG-33 vehicles being ordered by the US Military.
On 2 December 2012, BAE received a $37.6 million contract to convert 250 RG-33L 6×6 vehicles up to the Medium Mine Protected Vehicle status.  Differences include a rear ramp for deploying unmanned ground vehicles, a new heating and air conditioning system, larger modular interior, high mobility chassis, extensive equipment options, larger bullet-resistant windows, and 360-degree situational awareness suite.

Versions
RG-33 (4×4)
RG-33L (6×6)

Operators

 10 RG-33L in service with the Burundi Army.

Croatian Army

Djiboutian Army - 10 RG-33 

Egyptian Army - 260 RG-33L + 90 RG-33L HAGA  

 Took delivery of 24 RG-33s after being refurbished.

United States Army
United States Marine Corps
United States Special Operations Command

See also
 Buffel
 Casspir
 List of AFVs
 Mamba APC
 Matador (mine protected vehicle)
 Medium Mine Protected Vehicle - The U.S. Army Equivalent to the MRAP Program
 MRAP - U.S. Military Mine Resistant Ambush Protected Vehicle Program
 Nexter Aravis
 RCV-9
 RG-12
 RG-19
 RG-31
 RG-32
 RG-34
 RG-35

References

External links
baesystemspresskit.com, (membership required to access/view)
Deagel.com: RG-33

BAE Systems land vehicles
Armoured personnel carriers of South Africa
United States Marine Corps equipment
Military vehicles introduced in the 2000s
Wheeled armoured personnel carriers
Armoured personnel carriers of the post–Cold War period